Zhenkang County is located in the west of Yunnan province, China, bordering Burma's Shan State to the west. It is under the administration of the prefecture-level city of Lincang.

Ethnic groups
Ethnic Bulang are found in the following villages in Zhenkang County (Zhenkang Ethnic Gazetteer 1994).
Muchang District 木场区: Dalong 打龙, Mangxi 忙喜, Laohuangtian 老黄田, Jiuzhai 旧寨, Wengkong 翁控 in Dengteng 等藤
Fengwei Town 凤尾镇: Xuancai Village 轩菜村

Administration divisions
County government is located in Nansan Town

Zhenkang County has 3 towns, 3 townships and 1 ethnic township. 
3 towns
 Fengwei
 Mengpeng
 Nansan
3 townships
 Mangbing
 Mengdui
 Muchang
1 ethnic township
 Junsai Wa Lahu Lisu and De'ang

Climate

References

External links
Zhengkang County Official Site

County-level divisions of Lincang